Kenneth Vincent John Wheeler, OC (14 January 1930 – 18 September 2014) was a Canadian composer and trumpet and flugelhorn player, based in the U.K. from the 1950s onwards.

Most of his performances were rooted in jazz, but he was also active in free improvisation and occasionally contributed to rock music recordings. Wheeler wrote over one hundred compositions and was a skilled arranger for small groups and large ensembles.

Wheeler was the patron of the Royal Academy Junior Jazz course.

Early life
Wheeler was born in Toronto, Ontario, on 14 January 1930. Growing up in Toronto, he began playing the cornet at age 12 and became interested in jazz in his mid-teens. Wheeler spent a year studying composition at The Royal Conservatory of Music in 1950. In 1952 he moved to Britain. He found his way into the London jazz scene of the time, playing in groups led by Tommy Whittle, Tubby Hayes, and Ronnie Scott.

Career
In the late 1950s, he was a member of Buddy Featherstonhaugh's quintet together with Bobby Wellins. From 1959 until 1965 he was a member of John Dankworth's orchestra, during which time he also studied composition with Richard Rodney Bennett (1962-3) and Bill Russo (1963-4). He also with (Eric Burdon and) the Animals' Big Band that made its only public appearance at the 5th Annual British Jazz & Blues Festival in Richmond (1965) with tenors Stan Robinson, Dick Morrissey and Al Gay, baritone sax Paul Carroll, and fellow trumpets Ian Carr and Greg Brown. In 1968, Wheeler appeared on guitarist Terry Smith's first solo album, Fall Out.

Wheeler performed and recorded his own compositions with large jazz ensembles throughout his career, beginning with the first album under his own name, Windmill Tilter (1969), recorded with the John Dankworth band. BGO Records released a CD in September 2010. The big band album Song for Someone (1973) fused Wheeler's characteristic orchestral writing with passages of free improvisation provided by musicians such as Evan Parker and Derek Bailey, and was also named Album of the Year by Melody Maker magazine in 1975. It has subsequently been reissued on CD by Parker's Psi label.

In the mid-1960s, Wheeler became a close participant in the nascent free improvisation movement in London, playing with Parker, John Stevens, the Spontaneous Music Ensemble and the Globe Unity Orchestra. Despite the above-noted accomplishments, much of his reputation rests on his work with smaller jazz groups. Wheeler's first small group recordings to gain significant critical attention were Gnu High (1975) and Deer Wan (1977), both for the ECM label (Gnu High is one of the few albums to feature Keith Jarrett as a sideman since his tenure with Charles Lloyd). One exception from the ongoing collaboration with ECM was his rare album on CBC called Ensemble Fusionaire in 1976. This had three other Canadian musicians and was recorded in St. Mary's Church in Toronto for a different character to the sound than on the ECM recordings.

Wheeler was the trumpeter in the Anthony Braxton Quartet from 1971 to 1976. He was also a member of the chamber jazz trio Azimuth with John Taylor and Norma Winstone from 1977 to 2000. Their first release under this name was a 1977 album issued by ECM; two albums followed, with later albums coming in 1985 and 1995.  He was featured in a profile on composer Graham Collier in the 1985 Channel 4 documentary Hoarded Dreams.

Later life
Music for Large & Small Ensembles (1990) included the Wheeler compositions "Sea Lady" and "The Sweet Time Suite", the latter his most ambitious extended work for big band since Windmill Tilter. In 1997 Wheeler received widespread critical praise for his album Angel Song, which featured an unusual drummer-less quartet of Bill Frisell (guitar), Dave Holland (bass) and Lee Konitz (alto sax). Wheeler recorded seven albums with CAM Jazz from 2005 to 2008 but returned to ECM to record his final album, Songs for Quintet, in 2013.

Wheeler died after a short period of frail health at a nursing home in London on 18 September 2014. He was 84 years old. He was survived by his wife, Doreen, and his children, Mark and Louanne.

Discography

As leader/co-leader
 1968: Windmill Tilter (Fontana) with The John Dankworth Orchestra
 1973: Song for Someone (Incus)
 1975: Gnu High (ECM)
 1976: Ensemble Fusionaire (CBC)
 1977: Deer Wan (ECM)
 1980: Around 6 (ECM)
 1984: Double, Double You (ECM)
 1988: Flutter By, Butterfly (Soul Note)
 1988: Visions (Justin Time)
 1990: Music for Large & Small Ensembles (ECM)
 1990: The Widow in the Window (ECM)
 1991: Spanish Rhapsody (with Creative Art Ensemble Hungary by György Vukán)
 1992: Kayak (Ah Um)
 1997: All the More (Soul Note) recorded 1993
 1997: Angel Song (ECM)
 1999: A Long Time Ago (ECM)
 2003: Island (Artists House) with Bob Brookmeyer
 2003: Dream Sequence (Psi, 1995–2003 [2003])
 2004: Where Do We Go from Here? (CAM Jazz) with John Taylor
 2005: What Now? (CAM Jazz)
 2006: It Takes Two! (CAM Jazz)
 2008: Other People (CAM Jazz) with Hugo Wolf String Quartet featuring John Taylor
 2011: One of Many (CAM Jazz) with John Taylor and Steve Swallow
 2012: The Long Waiting (CAM Jazz)
 2013: Mirrors (Edition Records) London Vocal Project with Norma Winstone
 2013: Six for Six (CAM Jazz, recorded 2008)
 2015: Songs for Quintet (ECM, recorded 2013)
 2015: On the Way to Two (CAM Jazz, recorded 2005)

Collaborations with John Taylor
 with Norma Winstone, Paolo Fresu, Paolo Damiani, Tony Oxley: Live at Roccella Jonica (Ismez Polis, 1985)
 featuring Gabriele Mirabassi: Moon (Egea, 2001)
 with Riccardo Del Fra: Overnight (Sketch, 2002)
 Pause, and Think Again (Turtle, 1971)

As Azimuth
 Azimuth (ECM, 1977)
 The Touchstone (ECM, 1978)
 Départ, with Ralph Towner (ECM, 1979)
 Azimuth '85 (ECM, 1985)
 How It Was Then... Never Again (ECM, 1994)
 Siren's Song, with The Maritime Jazz Orchestra (Justin Time, 1997)

Other collaborations
 wrote/arranged "Ballad to Max" on Maynard Ferguson's album M.F. Horn (Columbia, 1970)
 arranged "Fire and Rain", "My Sweet Lord", and "Your Song" on Maynard Ferguson's album Alive & Well in London (Columbia, 1971)
 arranged "Theme from Summer of '42" and wrote/arranged "Free Wheeler" on Maynard Ferguson's album M.F. Horn Two (Columbia, 1972)
 with Elton Dean and Joe Gallivan: The Cheque Is in the Mail (Ogun, 1977)
 with Günter Christmann, Gerd Dudek, Albert Mangelsdorff, Paul Rutherford, Manfred Schoof: Horns (FMP, 1979)
 with Gordon Beck, Tony Oxley, Stan Sulzmann, Ron Mathewson: Seven Steps to Evans (MPS, 1980)
 with Tiziana Simona: Gigolo (ITM, 1986)
 with Claudio Fasoli, Jean-François Jenny Clark, Daniel Humair: Welcome (Soul Note, 1987)
 with Claudio Fasoli and Jean-François Jenny Clark: Land (Innowo/New Sound Planet, 1989)
 with Gordon Beck, Tony Oxley, Stan Sulzmann, Dieter Ilg: A Tribute to Bill Evans (Image Entertainment DVD, filmed 1991, released 1999)
 with Jeff Gardner, Hein van de Geyn, André Ceccarelli: California Daydream (Musidisc, 1992)
 with David Friedman, Jasper van't Hof: Greenhouse Fables (Sentemo, 1992)
 with Paolino Dalla Porta, Stefano Battaglia, Bill Elgart: Tales (Soul Note, 1993)
 with Claudio Fasoli, Mick Goodrick, Henri Texier - double bass, Billy Elgart - drums: "Ten tributes" (Ram records, 1994)
 with Rabih Abou Khalil - Sultan's Picnic, Enja Records, 1994)
 with Vandoorn (Ineke Vandoorn & Marc van Vugt) - The Question is me, Riff/Baixim records 1994
 with Paul Bley: Touché (Justin Time, 1996)
 with Sonny Greenwich: Live at the Montreal Bistro (Justin Time, 1998)
 with Brian Dickinson: Still Waters [Hornblower, 1999)
 with Lee Konitz: Live at Birdland Neuberg (Double Moon, 1999)
 with Fred Hersch, Norma Winstone, Paul Clarvis: 4 in Perspective (Village Life, 2000)
 with Marc Copland and John Abercrombie: That's for Sure (Challenge, 2001)
 with Stan Sulzmann and John Parricelli: Ordesa (Symbol, 2002)
 with Enrico Pieranunzi, Chris Potter, Charlie Haden & Paul Motian: Fellini Jazz (CAM Jazz, 2003)
 with Marc Copland and John Abercrombie: Brand New (Challenge, 2004)
 with Tony Coe, John Edwards, Alan Hacker, Sylvia Hallett, Marcio Mattos, Evan Parker, Philipp Wachsmann: Free Zone Appleby 2003 (PSI, 2004)
 with Gerd Dudek, Paul Dunmall, John Edwards, Tony Levin, Tony Marsh, Evan Parker, Paul Rogers, Philipp Wachsmann: Free Zone Appleby 2005 (PSI, 2006)
 with Evan Parker, Paul Dunmall, Tony Levin, John Edwards: Live at the Vortex, London (Rare Music, 2011)
 with Evan Parker, Steve Beresford, John Edwards, Louis Moholo-Moholo: Foxes Fox: Live at the Vortex (PSI, 2012)

Featured
 Robert 'Bob' Cornford, Tony Coe, Kenny Wheeler and the NDR 'Pops' Orchestra: Long Shadows (Chapter One, 2007; recorded 1979)
 The Guildhall Jazz Band: Walk Softly (Wave, 1998; recorded 1987)
 The Jürgen Friedrich Quartet Featuring Kenny Wheeler: Summerflood (CTI, 1998; reissued 2003)
 Tim Brady: Visions (Justin Time, 1988) with L'orchestre de Chambre de Montréal
 Dezső "Ablakos" Lakatos (sax.), Kenny Wheeler (tr.), György Vukán (piano), Balázs Berkes (bass), Imre Kőszegi (drums), Creative Art Ensemble Brass & Rhythm, in "Spanish Rapsody" of György Vukán  (CAE LP 002 Hungaroton, ARTISJUS 1991)
 The Upper Austrian Jazzorchestra: Plays the Music of Kenny Wheeler (West Wind, 1996)
 The Maritime Jazz Orchestra: Now and Now-Again (Justin Time, 2002; recorded 1998) with Norma Winstone and John Taylor
 UMO Jazz Orchestra: One More Time (A-Records, 2000) with Norma Winstone
 Munich Jazz Orchestra: Sometime Suite (Bassic Sound, 2001)
 Colours Jazz Orchestra: Nineteen Plus One (Astarte/Egea, 2009)

As sideman
With John Abercrombie
 Open Land (ECM, 1998)
With Rabih Abou-Khalil
Blue Camel (Enja, 1992)
The Sultan's Picnic (Enja, 1994)
With George Adams
 Sound Suggestions (ECM, 1979)
With Pepper Adams
Conjuration: Fat Tuesday's Session (Reservoir, 1983 [1990})
With the Berlin Contemporary Jazz Orchestra
 Berlin Contemporary Jazz Orchestra (Conducted by Alexander von Schlippenbach) (ECM, 1990)
With Jane Ira Bloom
 Art and Aviation (Arabesque, 1992)
 The Nearness (Arabesque, 1995)
With Anthony Braxton
The Complete Braxton (Freedom, 1971 [1973])
Quartet: Live at Moers Festival (Ring, 1974 [1976])
 New York, Fall 1974 (Arista, 1974)
 Five Pieces 1975 (Arista, 1975)
 The Montreux/Berlin Concerts (Arista, 1975-6)
 Creative Orchestra Music 1976 (Arista, 1976)
 Creative Orchestra (Köln) 1978 (hatART, 1978 [1995])
With Jakob Bro
 2011: Bro/Knak (Loveland) 
With Bill Bruford
 Feels Good to Me (EG, 1978)
With Rainer Brüninghaus
 Freigeweht (ECM, 1980)
With Don Cherry
 Actions (Philips, 1971)
With Steve Coleman
 Rhythm in Mind (Novus, 1991)
With CCS
 C.C.S. (RAK, 1970)
With Graham Collier
Deep Dark Blue Centre (Deram, 1967)
Hoarded Dreams (Cuneiform, 1983 [2007])
With Paolino Dalla Porta
 Tales (Soul Note, 1993)
With John Dankworth
With Pierre Favre
 Window Steps (ECM, 1995)
 What the Dickens! (Fontana, 1963)
With Claudio Fasoil
 Welcome (Soul Note, 1987)
 Guest (Soul Note, 1994)
 Ten Tributes (1995)
With Bill Frisell
 Rambler (ECM, 1985)
With Globe Unity Orchestra
 Globe Unity 67 & 70 (Atavistic, 2001), 1970 recording only
 Live in Wuppertal (FMP, 1973)
 Hamburg '74 with the NDR Chor (FMP, 1979)
 Evidence Vol. 1 (FMP, 1976; reissued on Rumbling, 1991)
 Into the Valley Vol. 2 (FMP, 1976; reissued on Rumbling, 1991)
 FMP S 6...Plus (FMP, digital download, 2012)
 Jahrmarkt/Local Fair (Po Torch, 1977)
 Improvisations (JAPO/ECM, 1977)
 Compositions (JAPO/ECM, 1979)
 Intergalactic Blow (JAPO, 1983)
 20th Anniversary (recorded 1986, FMP, 1993)
 40 Years (Intakt, 2007)
With Paul Gonsalves
 Humming Bird (Deram, 1970)
With Dave Holland Quintet
 Jumpin' In (ECM, 1984)
 Seeds of Time (ECM, 1985)
 The Razor's Edge (ECM, 1987)
With Mark Isaacs
 Elders Suite (Grace Recordings, 1999)With Philly Joe Jones Trailways Express (Black Lion, 1968 [1971])With Chris Kase A Song We Once Knew (Satchmo Jazz, 2000)With Andy Middleton Reinventing the World (2003)With Joni Mitchell Travelogue (Nonesuch, 2002)With Roscoe MitchellSketches from Bamboo (Moers Music, 1979)With Louis Moholo-Moholo Spirits Rejoice! (Ogun, 1978)With Tony Oxley Ichnos (RCA Victor, 1971)With Enrico Pieranunzi As Never Before (2008)With Paul Rutherford and Iskra 1912 Sequences 72 & 73 (Emanem, 1997)With Tommy Smith Azure (Linn, 1995)With Wadada Leo Smith Divine Love (ECM, 1978)With Thomas Stabenow What’s New (2010)With David Sylvian Brilliant Trees (Virgin, 1984)
 Alchemy: An Index of Possibilities (Virgin, 1985)
 Gone to Earth (Virgin, 1986)
 Dead Bees on a Cake (Virgin, 1999)With John Surman John Surman (Deram, 1969)With Ralph Towner Old Friends, New Friends (ECM, 1979)With Glauco Venier Trio Gorizia (Artesuono, 2013)With Ernst Vranckx A Child’s Blessing (1998)With Fabio Zeppetella' Moving Lines (1995)

References

External links

 Kenny Wheeler, Trumpeter and Flugelhornist, Dies at 84 at JazzTimes''
 2003 Interview with journalist John Eyles at All About Jazz
 2005 Review of the Kenny Wheeler Big Band by John Fordham in The Guardian
 Kenny Wheeler discography at discogs

1930 births
2014 deaths
Avant-garde jazz musicians
Canadian jazz composers
Male jazz composers
Canadian jazz trumpeters
Male trumpeters
ECM Records artists
Edition artists
Free improvisation
Honorary Members of the Royal Academy of Music
Musicians from Toronto
Nucleus (band) members
Officers of the Order of Canada
Post-bop trumpeters
The Royal Conservatory of Music alumni
United Jazz + Rock Ensemble members
20th-century Canadian composers
20th-century trumpeters
20th-century Canadian male musicians
Berlin Contemporary Jazz Orchestra members
Azimuth (band) members
The Dedication Orchestra members
Incus Records artists
Edition Records artists
20th-century jazz composers